Berufjörður is a fjord in Eastern Iceland. The village Djúpivogur (pop. 456) is located on its western shores. Route 1 passes on its shores.

See also 
 Djúpivogur
 Búlandstindur
 Eastern Iceland

References

External links 

Fjords of Iceland
Eastern Region (Iceland)